Zubair Jahan Khan (born 10 October 1972) is a Pakistani former professional squash player. He was world number 8 in his prime.

Zubair Jahan Khan lives in London and is a coach at Cumberland Lawn Tennis.

Zubair Jahan Khan's brothers Hiddy Jahan and Zarak Jahan Khan were also professional squash players.

References

External links

1972 births
Living people
Pakistani male squash players
Pakistani emigrants to the United Kingdom